A Fine Mess is the eighth extended play by American rock band Interpol. It was released on May 17, 2019, through Matador Records. It contains five songs that were recorded during the sessions for their previous studio album, Marauder (2018), but did not make its final cut. Like Marauder, A Fine Mess was produced by Dave Fridmann, while the song "Fine Mess" was co-produced by Claudius Mittendorfer and received additional production from Kaines and Tom A. D. Fuller. The song "Real Life" was first performed live during their Turn On the Bright Lights XV anniversary tour in 2017. "Fine Mess" and "The Weekend" were released as singles prior to the EP's release.

Critical reception
A Fine Mess was met with mixed or average reviews from critics. At Metacritic, which assigns a weighted average rating out of 100 to reviews from mainstream publications, this release received an average score of 59, based on 6 reviews.

Track listing

Charts

References

2019 EPs
Interpol (band) albums
Matador Records albums
Albums recorded at Tarbox Road Studios